The Hammond is a specialist performing arts offering training and education to students across school, college and degree courses.

History
In 1917, Irene Hammond, a dance teacher and performer from Cheltenham, moved to Chester where she began teaching dance for Amy Broom, née Webster, who was known for her classes at the Grosvenor Ballroom. The Webster School was already an established enterprise in Chester having been run by Broom’s father, Edgar, since 1833. The school was originally opened by Louis Doré of London in 1823.

By 1919, Hammond had officially taken over the school, which became known as the Miss Irene Hammond School. Over the last century, The Hammond has grown and developed, changing and adapting with the times. Betty Hassall, an early student of Hammond, took over the running of the school in 1946 in partnership with Madeline Chambers. At that time, eight hundred children were enrolled at the school and attending weekly classes across Cheshire and Shropshire.

In 1951, the school leased Hampton Lodge and boarding began. The school purchased Hampton Lodge in 1953 and by 1962, the school had expanded its teaching provision into Liverpool Road where it flourished until 1968. Betty Hassall was then instrumental in securing Hoole Bank House in Hoole Village for the school’s Education Department and by 1969, the entire school had moved to the site.

Overview
Today, The Hammond comprises a secondary school, sixth form and university for pupils aged 11years+, which offers specialist vocational training in Dance, Drama and Music. It also has a three-year professional course leading to the National Diploma in Professional Dance or the National Diploma in Musical Theatre, validated by Trinity College, London. Sixth form also offers a BTEC in Performing Arts (acting) combined with 2 A levels. The school is accredited to the Council for Dance Education and Training and is a member of the Independent Schools Association. The Hammond is a MADE (Music and Dance Excellence) School, one of 8 schools in England funded by the Music and Dance Scheme, offering full bursaries to talented young people.

The school's patron is Irek Mukhamedov – famed ballet dancer of the Bolshoi Ballet and Royal Ballet – who teaches students with a dancing Master Class at The Hammond every two years.

In 2018 The Hammond was listed by The Stage as one of "Seven drama schools where academic achievement is also top class".

Alumni 
Notable alumni include: 
Chris Barton actor and singer, finalists in BBC One's Any Dream Will Do.
Jonny Clarke actor, played Bart McQueen on the Channel 4 soap Hollyoaks.
Beau Dermott singer, received the golden buzzer on Britain's Got Talent.
Jorgie Porter actress and model, portrayed Theresa McQueen on the Channel 4 soap Hollyoaks and for being a contestant on I'm a Celebrity...Get Me Out of Here! and Dancing on Ice.

References

Schools of the performing arts in the United Kingdom
Educational institutions established in 1917
1917 establishments in England
Specialist arts colleges in England